Fårbo is a locality situated in Oskarshamn Municipality, Kalmar County, Sweden with 517 inhabitants in 2010.

Idol participant Mollie Lindén was born in Fårbo.

Sport
Fårbo FF is the name of the local football team

References

External links
Fårbo FF Official site of Fårbo FF, Fårbo's football team

Populated places in Kalmar County
Populated places in Oskarshamn Municipality